Marko Mlađan (Anglicized: Marko Mladjan, ; born 26 March 1993) is a Swiss-Serbian professional basketball player for SAM Basket. He is a 2.05 m (6 ft 9 in) tall forward.

Professional career
On 21 September 2016 he signed a one-year deal with Slovenian club Union Olimpija.

Personal life
His older brother Dušan is also a professional basketball player.

References

External links
 Eurobasket.com profile
 FIBA profile

1993 births
Living people
KK Olimpija players
Sportspeople from Lugano
Power forwards (basketball)
Serbian men's basketball players
Small forwards
Swiss men's basketball players
Swiss people of Serbian descent
Lions de Genève players
BBC Monthey players
Fribourg Olympic players
SAM Basket players
Lugano Tigers players